Sana Dati is a 2013 Philippine romantic drama film written, directed, edited, and scored by Jerrold Tarog. The film stars Lovi Poe and Paulo Avelino. It is the final installment to Tarog's Camera trilogy which include Confessional (2007) and The Blood Trail (2009).

It is one of the entries of Cinemalaya 2013 under the Director's Showcase, where it won eight awards including Best Film.

Synopsis
The film is a love story about a woman named Andrea (Lovi Poe) whose wedding is thrown into disarray when a mysterious guy, Dennis (Paulo Avelino) arrives and reminds her of the man she really loves.

Cast
 Lovi Poe as Andrea Gonzaga
 Paulo Avelino as Dennis Cesario
 TJ Trinidad as Robert Naval
 Benjamin Alves as Andrew Cesario
 Chinggoy Alonzo as Eugene Naval
 Carla Martinez as Vivian Gonzaga
 Liesl Batucan as Baby Gonzaga
 Ria Garcia as Jamie Gonzaga
 Nico Antonio as John
 Gee Canlas as Loiza
 Nonie Buencamino as Judge Batac
 Menggie Cobarrubias as Pastor
 Cai Cortez as Jean
 Bong Cabrera as Joel
 Jess Evardone as Bong
 Gaby dela Merced as Ria
 Mihk Vergara as Fritz

Awards

Notes

See also
 Jerrold Tarog
 Confessional (film)
 Mangatyanan
 Senior Year (2010 film)
 Cinema of the Philippines

References

External links
 Official Website
 

2013 films
Films directed by Jerrold Tarog
Philippine New Wave
GMA Pictures films